Kamran Usluer (1937 – 26 July 2004) was a Turkish film actor. He appeared in more than fifty films from 1966 to 2004.

Selected filmography

References

External links
 

1937 births
2004 deaths
Actors from İzmir
Turkish male film actors
20th-century Turkish male actors
Deaths from lung cancer in Turkey